Mohd Aminuddin Mohd Noor (born 18 August 1991 in Pasir Mas, Kelantan) is a Malaysian professional football player currently playing for Kelantan FA in the Malaysian Super League as a defender. He previously playing for PKNS FC after three year playing for others team.

References

External links
 
 Aminuddin Noor Stats

1991 births
Living people
People from Kelantan
Malaysian footballers
Malaysian people of Malay descent
Association football defenders
PKNS F.C. players